Singhan was a king of the Yadava kingdom in approximately the 13th century, located in what today is the Maharashtra State of India.

13th-century Indian monarchs
13th-century deaths
Year of birth unknown